The Chicago and North Western Railway Passenger Depot is a historic building located at 200 Dousman Street in the Broadway District of downtown Green Bay, Wisconsin, formerly served by the Chicago and North Western Railway. At its peak, it served trains such as the Flambeau 400 between Chicago and Ashland. The depot opened in 1899 and regular passenger service ended in 1971. The building was purchased by the Titletown Brewing company in 1996, although they moved out in 2021 . It was added to the National Register of Historic Places in 1999. The Wisconsin Central still uses the track for freight.

The depot is on the Packers Heritage Trail and is the location of the Receiver Statue. The station was used for the Green Bay Packers' first ever road trip to Ishpeming, Michigan, and other short trips within the Midwest.

References

External links

Culture of Green Bay, Wisconsin
Packers Heritage Trail
Tourist attractions in Brown County, Wisconsin
Buildings and structures in Green Bay, Wisconsin
National Register of Historic Places in Brown County, Wisconsin
1899 establishments in Wisconsin
Railway stations in the United States opened in 1899
Railway stations closed in 1971
Italian Renaissance Revival architecture in the United States
1996 establishments in Wisconsin
Railway stations on the National Register of Historic Places in Wisconsin
Green Bay
Former railway stations in Wisconsin